Əylis or Aylis or Akulisy or Akulis may refer to:
Aşağı Əylis (Nerkin Agulis, Lower Agulis), Azerbaijan
Yuxarı Əylis (Verin Agulis, Upper Agulis), Azerbaijan
Agulis (historical)